Harold Reginald Newgass, GC (3 August 1896 – 17 November 1984) was a Royal Naval Volunteer Reserve officer of the Second World War who was awarded the George Cross for the "great gallantry and undaunted devotion to duty" he showed in defusing an enemy parachute mine over two days in 1940.

Early life
Newgass was born into a wealthy Jewish family in central London, at 54 Princes Gate, Knightsbridge, SW7 on 3 August 1899, the son of Maria Regina (née Hess) and Benjamin Newgass. He had two older brothers, Edgar Isaac and Gerald. As two of his paternal aunts married into wealthy American families, Babette Newgass Lehman (married to Meyer Lehman) and Esther Newgass Hellman (married to Isaias W. Hellman), his father was named the head of the Lehman family cotton operations in New Orleans (named Lehman, Newgass & Co) after the Lehman brothers moved their headquarters to New York City. His father later moved to Liverpool, then the global center of textile manufacturing, and opened a branch office. The three brothers-in-laws continued to invest in each other's ventures in railroads, banks, and commodities.

Harold had served in the Territorial Army attached to the Royal Artillery from 1918 to 1934. He also worked as a volunteer  club leader at the Oxford and St Georges Jewish Youth Club in Berners Street Bernhard Baron Settlement, now in Henriques Street,E1 (building still stands as luxury flats) and was affectionately known as 'Pop'Newgass

Second World War
On the evening of 28–29 November 1940, a German parachute mine fell on the Garston Gas Works in Liverpool. It was unknown whether it was magnetic, acoustic, delayed action or just a "dud". Consequently, this caused extensive disruption in the area, with factory work halted and over 6,000 people removed from the vicinity. Additionally, railway and dock sidings were closed and the gas supply to the south and east of Liverpool was disrupted.

The "luftmine" had fallen through a large gas holder and its parachute had become entangled in the hole in the roof. The large entry hole made by the mine allowed gas to escape and a portion of the roof to sink. It was also leaning on one of the -high brick piers on which, in turn, the iron pillars that supported the roof were fixed.

Additionally, the mine's fuse mechanism was against the pillar, meaning that the mine had to be turned before it could be defused. Some of the water was pumped out and an access hole was cut into the side of the gas holder. The job of now rendering the mine safe was left to Temporary Lieutenant Harold Newgass.

Newgass could only enter the gas holder with the aid of breathing apparatus supplying oxygen via cylinder. The Auxiliary Fire Service prepared six cylinders, each with a life of about 30 minutes. He would have to take it in stages over the next two days.

Newgass now worked hard to use each available cylinder's 30-minute window. The strain of the operation meant that Newgass used more and more oxygen and the 30 minutes dwindled rapidly. He later commented: "Working in an oxygen mask is a bit of a strain".

Using the first cylinder, Newgass checked the mine and prepared his plan to defuse the device. Using the second cylinder, he carried his tools and a ladder to the mine. On the third sortie he placed sandbags around the nose of the mine, and tied the top of the mine to the iron roof support.

On 30 November 1940, using the fourth cylinder, Newgass began the difficult defusing operation. Turning the mine to reveal the fuse he then removed it and the unit primer and detonator. Almost exhausted Newgass returned for the fifth cylinder and now turned the mine further to undo clock-keep ring. With his final cylinder he was again to extract the clock, rendering the mine inert.

Garston employers now removed the mine by removing it with block and tackle. It was put on a lorry for disposal. Had the mine detonated, the whole of Garston Works, and much of the surrounding properties would have been completely destroyed in the blast.

Newgass was subsequently awarded the George Cross for his actions. The announcement for the award was published in the London Gazette on 4 March 1941, reading:

Legacy
Newgass's medal group of George Cross, Defence Medal and War Medal 1939-45 are on display in the Victoria Cross & George Cross Gallery at the Imperial War Museum in London.

There is a street named after him on a new housing estate in Garston where all the other streets are named after English ports.

References

External links
 

1896 births
1984 deaths
Bomb disposal personnel
British Army personnel of World War I
British recipients of the George Cross
Royal Navy officers
Royal Navy recipients of the George Cross
Royal Naval Volunteer Reserve personnel of World War II